Lorenc is both a surname and a given name, from Lorenz in German, derived from the Roman surname Laurentius. Notable people with the name include:

Surname
Czesław Lorenc (1925–2015), Polish rower
Jan Lorenc (born 1954), Polish-American designer and writer
Kito Lorenc (1938–2017), German writer
Michał Lorenc (born 1955), Polish film score composer
Richard Lorenc (born 1951), Australian soccer referee
Ziggy Lorenc (born 1958), Canadian television and radio personality

Given name
Lorenc Antoni (1909–1991), Kosovo Albanian composer, conductor and ethnomusicologist
Lorenc Shehaj (born 1994), Albanian footballer
Lorenc Trashi (born 1992), Albanian footballer

See also
Lorenç Mallol, 14th-century Spanish poet
Lorenz

Albanian masculine given names